The Prairie Bayou Stakes is an American Thoroughbred horse race held annually in December at Turfway Park in Florence, Kentucky. It is a Listed race.

Recent Winners

Past winners

References

Horse races in Kentucky
Turfway Park
Turfway Park horse races